Tayvallich (pronounced) is a small village in the Knapdale area of Argyll and Bute, in Scotland. The village name has its origins in Gaelic, and means the "house of the pass". The village is built around a sheltered harbour on Loch Sween. It has a primary school, caravan park, pub and village store. The local economy is based on tourism and fishing. There is also a local bus service that takes the older children to nearby Lochgilphead where the nearest high school is situated. Tayvallich has become a popular sailing centre. During the summer months a ferry (RIB) operates from Tayvallich to Craighouse, Jura, six days a week.

Carsaig
Tayvallich is split into two areas; Carsaig and Tayvallich. Loch Sween cuts northeast into the Knapdale Peninsula and the western shore of the loch forms a smaller peninsula. Towards the north end of this peninsula an isthmus is formed about a kilometre wide and the east side has an almost landlocked bay which is where Tayvallich is located and the west side of the isthmus is Carsaig Bay. A road now links Tayvallich and Carsaig.

Notes

Further reading
 Pease, John M. (2010) Taynish: a history of the Ross estate. Argyll Publishing.

External links

www.tayvallich.com
 

Villages in Knapdale